Meinolf Koch (born 12 July 1957) is a retired German football player. He spent seven seasons in the Bundesliga with Borussia Dortmund. The best league finish he achieved was sixth place.

References

External links
 

1957 births
Living people
German footballers
Borussia Dortmund players
Bundesliga players

Association football midfielders